A Benson raft was a huge seagoing log barge designed to transport large quantities of timber to Southern California from the Pacific Northwest and Canada. The rafts were used to transport industrial quantities of unprocessed timber at one time over hundreds of miles of waterway. The technique of building barges this way was efficient and saved transportation costs. John A. Fastaben was the key raft-building specialist that Simon Benson hired as a construction supervisor to assemble his unique log barge rafts. This innovation resulted in lower cost of finished lumber and contributed to the boom of the construction industry in the first part of the twentieth century for builders in Southern California. The building of these ended in 1941 when mysterious fires broke out in a short period of time and sabotage was suspected.

History
Simon Benson, a lumber baron of Portland, Oregon, developed the first practical transportation industrial barge to reliably transport millions of board feet (1000 board feet is ) of timber at one time through the open ocean on the west coast of the United States. This was done by tying together hundreds of logs into one bundle and floating the assembled stockpile raft down waterways by means of tugs. A finished constructed log raft barge assembly went from the outlet of the Columbia River in northwestern United States into the Pacific Ocean and south  to San Diego, California. Once there, the logs were cut into lumber by the Benson Lumber Company for marketing. The majority of the milled lumber went to San Diego builders. The entire timber enterprise venture of logging and lumbering was a commercially successful business for Benson because of being able to save the extravagant transportation costs charged by the railroads. The first Benson raft was launched in 1906 by the Benson Logging Company.

John A. Fastabend was Benson's supervisor for the collection and assemblage of the needed logs for an industrial size commercial timber barge raft. He was a self taught raft-building specialist and began his sea-going assembled log raft barge building in 1894. His was the first such raft constructed on the Pacific coast and built for the Robinson Rafting Company in Stella, Washington. The town is  up the Columbia River inland from the Pacific Coast of the United States. The raft he assembled consisted of fir logs to be used in wharf construction at the San Francisco harbor. It scattered over 400,000 lineal feet of high grade piling over  miles of the Clatsop beaches on the Oregon coast.

Fastabend tried again and built a second raft the next year in 1895 that was about the same size, but secured together better with more logging chains. It held together as it was being towed south in the Pacific Ocean off the coast of northern California. However, just before finally arriving at its destination port it also broke apart scattering all the logs. Fastabend constructed a third industrial log raft assembly two years later in 1897. This time he was successful in the project. His product of fir piling went down the California coast intact. It arrived in San Francisco undamaged and brought its owners an excellent price. The profit they made because of savings in transportation overhead costs almost paid for the loss of the two previous log raft failures. He made several more such rafts for the Robinson Rafting Company over the next several years.

Benson saw Fastabend's success and hired him for the Benson Logging Company in 1904. He became their supervisor for the collection and assemblage of the needed logs for the industrial size commercial timber rafts. The construction site for these rafts was at a tributary body of water called Wallace slough near Astoria, Oregon. Fastabend had a crew of about a dozen men that worked under him at any one time. He was 69 years old in 1922 and considered an elderly, keen-eyed, gray-haired man. He was then constructing five rafts a year and had already built 57 log rafts for Benson. These were sent to San Diego pulled by a steamship towboat with 1,200 to 1,500 horse power. The 112th Benson log raft barge was launched in 1938 and the last of 120 total was launched in 1941.

Four of the 120 Benson rafts were lost due to fire or storms. The last Benson log barge had a fire that broke out on it from an unknown origin and it burned for two days before it broke apart scattering loose logs into the Pacific Ocean, causing a navigational hazard off the coast of San Francisco. The previous two barges broke apart within a year under mysterious fires. Only three in the previous 34 years of over 100 constructed Benson barges ever had fires before, so sabotage was suspected. It was then decided to cancel any further building of the Benson barges.

Construction 
Benson rafts were built to float like a gigantic tree trunk. They were constructed of felled trees and tied together with giant logging chains.
The raft's cargo of logs began with a roughly cigar-shaped temporary "cradle" of wood resembling the frame of a large wooden sailing ship. A derrick placed logs in the cradle over a period of four to seven weeks, lacing them with tree-length timbers for added strength and stability. Large logging chains tied the raft together. When complete, one half of the cradle was removed and the raft was launched sideways into the water.

A typical Benson log raft took anywhere from four to six weeks to assemble. The assembly involved 125 tons of chain. Fastabend had a special technique for tying the logs together with logging chains and steel cable. The pattern of these was known as a "herring-bone" arrangement. As the logs were placed into a shipyard type cigar-shaped wooden cylindrical cradle they were periodically tightened with  donkey engines to keep the mass of logs tight as it was being assembled into one ultimate giant barge. The periodic tightening technique of the encircled bands of chain and cable made the assembly stiffer and stouter therefore becoming worthy of traveling through ocean currents.

Many of the Benson sea-going log rafts were "deck loaded", with fence posts, telephone poles, and processed lumber such as shingles, stacked on top the log rafts for transportation cost savings. It is estimated that building in Southern California doubled in just four years following the arrival of cheaper lumber via Benson rafts. Benson log rafts dramatically lowered shipping costs from that of railroad and traditional ocean barge transportation. They were the first ever seagoing ocean-worthy logging rafts to transport intact millions of board feet over a long distance on the Pacific Ocean. A proposal was brought up to use them to ship timber to China, but there is no evidence it ever occurred.

References

Sources

Barges of the United States
History of Oregon
History of Southern California
Logging